Giga is a joint programme of work of two United Nations Agencies, UNICEF and the International Telecommunication Union to connect all of the world's schools to the internet. The programme works by identifying all schools in countries, and providing financial resources to the schools, so that connectivity can be procured. The Secretary-General of the United Nations in February 2022 called on the United Nations General Assembly to recognize "access to the internet as a basic human right, [...] including through the Giga Initiative".

Active countries 
 Central Asia
 Kazakhstan: 7,410 schools mapped
 Kyrgyzstan: 692 schools connected
 Latin America and Eastern Caribbean
 Eastern Caribbean States (OECS): 9/11 countries completed mapping
 Honduras: 545 schools connected
 Sub-Saharan Africa
 Rwanda: identified 1,530 schools via satellite imagery
 Kenya: 75 schools connected
 Sierra Leone: 205 schools connected
 Niger: RfP for feasibility study published

Headquarters
According to La Vanguardia(15 July 2022)  the project will be located in a refurbished warehouse in Barcelona  which houses an innovation centre  known as Ca l’Alier 
]

References

International Telecommunication Union